Eucalyptus crebra, commonly known as the narrow-leaved ironbark, narrow-leaved red ironbark or simply ironbark, and as muggago in the indigenous Dharawal language, is a species of small to medium-sized tree endemic to eastern Australia. It has hard, rough "ironbark" from its trunk to small branches, linear to lance-shaped adult leaves, flower buds in groups of seven, nine or eleven, white flowers and cup-shaped, barrel-shaped or hemispherical fruit. A variable species, it grows in woodland and forest from the Cape York Peninsula to near Sydney. It is an important source of nectar in the honey industry and its hard, strong timber is used in construction.

Description
It has persistent thick, rough, deeply furrowed, greyish black "ironbark" from the base of its trunk to the small branches. The flower buds are arranged in groups of seven, nine or eleven, usually on a branching inflorescence on the ends of branchlets. Flowering has been recorded in most months and the flowers are white.

Taxonomy and naming
Eucalyptus crebra was first formally described in Journal and Proceedings of the Linnean Society, Botany by Victorian state botanist Ferdinand von Mueller in 1859. The specific epithet is the Latin adjective crebra meaning "thick", "close" or "numerous", referring to the species' abundance.

Narrow-leaved ironbark has included several species, including E. drepanophylla and E. xanthoclada but these are regarded as synonyms by the Australian Plant Census. Eucalyptus repanophylla is accepted as a separate species by the Queensland Government. Other similar species include E. exilipes, E. granitica, E. staigeriana, E. quadricostata and E. whitei.

Distribution and habitat
The narrow-leaved ironbark grows in sandy soils in woodland and forest from Picton, southwest of Sydney, north through New South Wales and Queensland to the vicinity of Cairns.

Uses
The tree has a hard, strong, and dark red timber, which has been used for sleepers and construction. A plank has been recorded as being used for Elizabeth Farm, Australia's oldest surviving European dwelling. It is used as a shade tree or to line roadways, and is also available as a cultivar. It is useful in honey production as the flowers are heavy in nectar and pollen; the resulting honey produced by bees is light-coloured and delicately flavoured.

Gallery

References

External links 
  Eucalyptus crebra
 USDA profile

crebra
Flora of Queensland
Flora of New South Wales
Drought-tolerant trees
Myrtales of Australia
Trees of Australia
Taxa named by Ferdinand von Mueller